Monica Rose Holmes, née Blagrove (born 1944) is an English-born Australian politician.

Biography

Early life
Monica Holmes was born in Bushey in Hertfordshire, England on 25 June 1944. She emigrated to Western Australia in 1983.

Career
She worked as a self-employed hotelier and an executive with the Chamber of Commerce and Industry.

In 1996, she was elected to the Western Australian Legislative Assembly as the Liberal member for the new seat of Southern River. She was Deputy Chairman of Committees from 1997 to 1999 and Acting Speaker from 1999 to 2001, when she lost her seat.

References

1944 births
Living people
People from Bushey
Politicians from Perth, Western Australia
Liberal Party of Australia members of the Parliament of Western Australia
Members of the Western Australian Legislative Assembly
21st-century Australian politicians
Women members of the Western Australian Legislative Assembly
21st-century Australian women politicians